The Team competition of the 2022 European Aquatics Championships was held on 15 August 2022.

Results
The final started at 13:00.

References

Diving
European Aquatics Championships